Promeny (also known by the English title Changes) is a film released in 2009, written and directed by Tomás Rehorek, Miracle Film & TV and Lumiq Studios production.

The production was presented at the Cannes Film Festival in May 2012.

Plot

Four stories, four dramatic destinies about real people. The first, a rich businessman who solve his infertility problems but little matter to his wife. Then a mother, poor and with two children, who can not rely on anyone but herself in a chaotic city. A middle age man, who learns not to be able to build social relationships after a life spent in working. And an older woman, whose life was entirely spent in search of a meaning. Four people affected by the same unjust fate, that strikes everyone without discrimination, living stories than speak on family, inner expiation and love.

Production
The film project is a production Miracle Film & TV and Lumiq Studios (Turin).

References

External links
 Promeny at the Internet Movie Database
 Official Fanpage https://www.facebook.com/pages/Promeny/116264871843415

2009 drama films
2000s Czech films
Czech drama films
Italian drama films